All Saints' Church is a Church of England parish church in West Dulwich, South London. It is a red brick building designed in a Gothic Revival style by George Fellowes Prynne and built 1888–91. It is Grade I listed.

Parish
All Saints' parish was formed from the western part of the parish of St Luke's, West Norwood and also included a detached part of the parish of St Leonard's Church, Streatham. The area that became All Saints’ parish was largely rural until West Dulwich railway station was opened in 1863. The decades after then were marked by an upsurge in residential development, a large proportion of the new houses being on a substantial scale. In the 1880s, a temporary iron church was erected in Rosendale Road. This was replaced by a permanent structure that was consecrated on 13 November 1897.

The 1901 Census recorded the parish's population as 3,665. In the following year it was served by one clergyman and attendance at its services (morning and evening combined) represented 37.3% of the parochial population.

Based on statistics from UK censuses, the Diocese of Southwark estimates the population of All Saints’ parish was 5,700 in 2001 and 6,400 in 2011.

Building

The church was designed by George Fellowes Prynne, a pupil of George Edmund Street. It stands on a site that slopes dramatically down from Lovelace Road to Rosendale Road. The east end of the church is lofty and the whole church, with the exception of the incomplete west bay, is situated over crypt spaces, which are extensively used by the wider community. The northeast corner of the building has four storeys of accommodation. An enclosed staircase rises to church floor level across the east elevation.

The building is vast in scale even though incomplete. The nave was intended to be three bays longer with an apsidal western baptistery. A flèche was intended over the chancel arch, flanked by a tall slender tower. Only the base of the flèche exists and the present bell turret by JBS Comper of 1952 is a modest substitute.

The church is brick-built with stone dressings and steep-pitched slated roofs. The aisles have individual double-pitched roofs with deep valley gutters alongside the nave's clerestory. There is a four-bay nave, the west bay being incomplete with no clerestory and what was intended to be a temporary slated gable end. It is flanked by narrow aisles and porches (now used for other purposes). The nave is flanked by the Lady Chapel in the north aisle and All Souls' Chapel in the south aisle. The apsidal chancel is enclosed by a narrow ambulatory. To the north the Lady Chapel has its own arcaded chancel with ambulatory. To the south of the chancel the space is occupied by the organ chamber and vestries.

In June 1944 a V-1 flying bomb exploded near the church, shattering the stained glass windows and damaging the roof. Services continued in the crypt until the church was restored after the war.

On 9 June 2000 fire destroyed the building's interior. Restoration work was completed in April 2006, providing the western end of the church with a modern entrance that contrasts with the Gothic architecture of the remainder of the building. The church's organ was also destroyed in the fire. In the summer of 2011 a 1969 organ, previously in the chapel at St Paul's School in Barnes, was installed at All Saints.

Other uses
The church is the home of the Lambeth Orchestra and the Dulwich Symphony Orchestra. After the restoration, a private nursery was installed in the basement.

References

Sources

External links

All Saints West Dulwich

1897 establishments in England
19th-century Church of England church buildings
West Dulwich
West Dulwich
Churches completed in 1897
Dulwich
Gothic Revival church buildings in London
Grade I listed churches in London
Grade I listed buildings in the London Borough of Lambeth
Religious organizations established in 1897
Churches bombed by the Luftwaffe in London